Logan O'Connor (born August 14, 1996) is a Canadian-American professional ice hockey forward currently playing for the  Colorado Avalanche of the National Hockey League (NHL). O'Connor won the Stanley Cup with the Avalanche in 2022.

Early life
O'Connor is the son of former NHL player Myles O'Connor and was born while his father played for the Houston Aeros in the International Hockey League. He was raised in Calgary, Alberta, after his father retired from playing.

Playing career

Amateur
O'Connor first played as a bantam and midget within the Calgary Royals organization of the Alberta Midget Hockey League (AMHL). Opting to pursue a collegiate career, O'Connor was selected with the 194th overall pick by the Sioux Falls Stampede in the 2013 United States Hockey League (USHL) Entry Draft.

During first junior season with the Stampede in the 2013–14 season, O'Connor committed to the University of Denver of the National Collegiate Hockey Conference (NCHC). As a 17-year-old with Sioux Falls, O'Connor was placed on the checking line and recorded 3 goals and 10 points in 59 games.

In the following 2014–15 season, O'Connor was named captain of the Stampede and continued his development by increasing his scoring presence in posting 16 goals and 36 points in 58 regular season games. In the postseason, he contributed 10 points in 12 games for Sioux Falls to help capture the Clark Cup.

Embarking on his collegiate career with the Denver Pioneers in the 2015–16 season, O'Connor appeared in 23 games for two goals and two assists as a freshman. In the following 2016–17 season, he became a fixture among the Pioneers checking line, registering 7 goals and 18 points while appearing in all 44 games to help Denver claim the 2017 national championship.

In his junior season in 2017–18, O'Connor again appeared every game with the Pioneers, posting a season-best 21 points while leading the Pioneers with two short-handed goals through 41 games. He helped the Pioneers claim the NCHC championship and was named to the All-Tournament Team.  Named as a two-time All-Academic in the NCHC, O'Connor was selected as captain of the Pioneers for his senior season on June 7, 2018.

Professional
At the conclusion of his junior season and following the 2018 NHL Entry Draft, O'Connor was invited to attend the Colorado Avalanche development camp. On July 24, 2018, O'Connor forwent his senior season as captain with the Pioneers in agreeing to a two-year, entry-level contract as an undrafted free agent with the Avalanche.

O'Connor began the 2018-19 season with the Avalanche's American Hockey League (AHL) affiliate, the Colorado Eagles. On December 30, he was recalled by the Avalanche. O'Connor made his debut the following night in a 3-2 loss to the Los Angeles Kings. He finished the season with five scoreless appearances for the Avalanche and 42 points in 64 games for the Eagles.

On November 27, 2019, O'Connor scored his first career NHL goal in a 4-1 win over the Edmonton Oilers. He skated in 16 games for the Avalanche during the regular season. He also played in five postseason games, recording one assist.

On September 18, 2020, the Avalanche re-signed O'Connor to a two-year contract extension.

On September 22, 2021, the Avalanche re-signed O'Connor to a three-year, $3.15 million dollar extension.

Career statistics

Awards and honours

References

External links

1996 births
Living people
Colorado Avalanche players
Colorado Eagles players
Denver Pioneers men's ice hockey players
Sioux Falls Stampede players
Stanley Cup champions
Undrafted National Hockey League players
American ice hockey right wingers